The Douglas–Coldwell Foundation is a left-wing Canadian think tank devoted, in the words of its slogan, to "promoting education and research into social democracy." It was founded in 1971, and is based in Ottawa.

The Foundation was named for and inspired by Tommy Douglas, the first federal leader of the New Democratic Party from 1961 to 1971, and M. J. Coldwell, leader of its predecessor Co-operative Commonwealth Federation from 1942 to 1960. Both had desired a Canadian counterpart to the Fabian Society.

In 1987, it merged with the Ontario Woodsworth Memorial Foundation of Toronto, named for Coldwell's predecessor as CCF leader, J. S. Woodsworth.

The foundation has underwritten biographies of Douglas, Coldwell, Clarence Gillis, Stanley Knowles, and Grace MacInnis, and scholarships and lectureships at Canadian post-secondary institutions. The foundation also gives out yearly grants totalling up to $25,000 for projects supporting its mandate of "promoting education and research in social democracy."

The foundation is a registered charitable foundation, contributions to which are tax-deductible in Canada; it accepts memberships and solicits donations from individuals and organizations in the general public. While predominantly associated with NDP members and activists, and concerned in part with the history and future of the party, it is an independent group with no administrative connection to any political party.

Tommy Douglas was the foundation's first president. Trade unionist Kalmen Kaplansky led the think tank in the 1980s and 1990s.Tessa Hebb served as president from 1995 to 2005, followed by David Mackenzie, David White and David Mackenzie again until 2016. Former NDP senior advisor Karl Bélanger became president of the foundation in November 2016.

References

External links
 

Charities based in Canada
Organizations based in Ottawa
Organizations established in 1971
Political and economic research foundations
Political and economic think tanks based in Canada
Socialist education
Socialist think tanks
1971 establishments in Canada